In mathematics, a full subcategory A of a category B is said to be reflective in B when the inclusion functor from A to B has a left adjoint. This adjoint is sometimes called a reflector, or localization. Dually, A is said to be coreflective in B when the inclusion functor has a right adjoint.

Informally, a reflector acts as a kind of completion operation. It adds in any "missing" pieces of the structure in such a way that reflecting it again has no further effect.

Definition

The pair  is called the A-reflection of B. The morphism  is called the A-reflection arrow. (Although often, for the sake of brevity, we speak about  only as being the A-reflection of B).

This is equivalent to saying that the embedding functor  is a right adjoint. The left adjoint functor  is called the reflector. The map  is the unit of this adjunction.

If all A-reflection arrows are (extremal) epimorphisms, then the subcategory A is said to be (extremal) epireflective. Similarly, it is bireflective if all reflection arrows are bimorphisms.

All these notions are special case of the common generalization—-reflective subcategory, where  is a class of morphisms.

The -reflective hull of a class A of objects is defined as the smallest -reflective subcategory containing A. Thus we can speak about reflective hull, epireflective hull, extremal epireflective hull, etc.

An anti-reflective subcategory is a full subcategory A such that the only objects of B that have an A-reflection arrow are those that are already in A.

Dual notions to the above-mentioned notions are coreflection, coreflection arrow, (mono)coreflective subcategory, coreflective hull, anti-coreflective subcategory.

Examples

Algebra
 The category of abelian groups Ab is a reflective subcategory of the category of groups, Grp. The reflector is the functor that sends each group to its abelianization. In its turn, the category of groups is a reflective subcategory of the category of inverse semigroups.
 Similarly, the category of commutative associative algebras is a reflective subcategory of all associative algebras, where the reflector is quotienting out by the commutator ideal. This is used in the construction of the symmetric algebra from the tensor algebra.
 Dually, the category of anti-commutative associative algebras is a reflective subcategory of all associative algebras, where the reflector is quotienting out by the anti-commutator ideal. This is used in the construction of the exterior algebra from the tensor algebra.
 The category of fields is a reflective subcategory of the category of integral domains (with injective ring homomorphisms as morphisms). The reflector is the functor that sends each integral domain to its field of fractions.
 The category of abelian torsion groups is a coreflective subcategory of the category of abelian groups. The coreflector is the functor sending each group to its torsion subgroup.
 The categories of elementary abelian groups, abelian p-groups, and p-groups are all reflective subcategories of the category of groups, and the kernels of the reflection maps are important objects of study; see focal subgroup theorem.
 The category of groups is a coreflective subcategory of the category of monoids: the right adjoint maps a monoid to its group of units.

Topology
 The category of Kolmogorov spaces (T0 spaces) is a reflective subcategory of Top, the category of topological spaces, and the Kolmogorov quotient is the reflector.
The category of completely regular spaces CReg is a reflective subcategory of Top. By taking Kolmogorov quotients, one sees that the subcategory of Tychonoff spaces is also reflective.
The category of all compact Hausdorff spaces is a reflective subcategory of the category of all Tychonoff spaces (and of the category of all topological spaces). The reflector is given by the Stone–Čech compactification.
The category of all complete metric spaces with uniformly continuous mappings is a reflective subcategory of the category of metric spaces. The reflector is the completion of a metric space on objects, and the extension by density on arrows.
The category of sheaves is a reflective subcategory of presheaves on a topological space. The reflector is sheafification, which assigns to a presheaf the sheaf of sections of the bundle of its germs.

Functional analysis
The category of Banach spaces is a reflective subcategory of the category of normed spaces and bounded linear operators. The reflector is the norm completion functor.

Category theory
For any Grothendieck site (C, J), the topos of sheaves on (C, J) is a reflective subcategory of the topos of presheaves on C, with the special further property that the reflector functor is left exact.  The reflector is the sheafification functor a : Presh(C) → Sh(C, J), and the adjoint pair (a, i) is an important example of a geometric morphism in topos theory.

Properties

 The components of the counit are isomorphisms.
 If D is a reflective subcategory of C, then the inclusion functor D → C creates all limits that are present in C.
 A reflective subcategory has all colimits that are present in the ambient category.
 The monad induced by the reflector/localization adjunction is idempotent.

Notes

References

 

 

Adjoint functors